Frank Schaefer or Schaeffer may refer to:

 Frank Schaefer (football manager) (born 1963), German football manager
 Frank Schaefer (minister) (born 1961), German-American author and LGBTQ advocate
 Frank Schaeffer (born 1952), American author and film director
 Frank E. Schaeffer Jr. (1905–1977), member of the Wisconsin State Assembly

See also
 Frank Schaffer (born 1958), East German athlete
 Frank Schäffer (born 1952), German footballer
 Frank Scheffer (born 1956), Dutch cinematographer and producer
 Frank Shaffer (1859–1939), American baseball player